

References

External links 
IMDB listing for German films made in 1940
listing for films made in 1940

German
Lists of German films
film